is a passenger railway station in the city of  Hirakata, Osaka Prefecture, Japan, operated by the private railway company Keihan Electric Railway.

Lines

Station layout
The station has two ground-level opposed side platforms connected by an elevated station building.

Platforms

Adjacent stations

History
The station was opened on November 1, 1938.

Passenger statistics
In the 2009 fiscal year, the station was used by an average of 4,885 passengers daily.

Surrounding area
Amano River
 Hirakata Hoshigaoka Post Office

See also
List of railway stations in Japan

References

External links

Official home page 

Railway stations in Osaka Prefecture
Railway stations in Japan opened in 1938
Hirakata, Osaka